Marinilactibacillus is a genus of bacteria from the family of Carnobacteriaceae.

References

Lactobacillales
Bacteria genera
Taxa described in 2003